The New South Wales Legislative Assembly is elected from single-member electorates called districts, returning 93 members since the 1999 election. Prior to 1927 some districts returned multiple members, including 1920-1927 when all districts returned 3,4 or 5 members. Parramatta is the only district to have continuously existed since the establishment of the Assembly in 1856.

External links
New South Wales State Electoral Commission

New South Wales Election Results 1856–2007

 

New South Wales